Margaret Richardson may refer to:

Margaret Richardson (curler), Scottish curler
Margaret Richardson (lawyer), American lawyer
Margaret Bonds, composer and pianist, married name Richardson
Margaret Foster Richardson, painter

See also
Margaret Richards (disambiguation)